Silvia Brunner (during her marriage Jörg-Brunner)  (born 11 January 1958) is a former speed skater who represented her native country Switzerland in two consecutive Winter Olympics, starting in 1980 in Lake Placid, United States.

History
Silvia Brunner first came to the attention of the speedskating world when she won the first of her eight Swiss sprint titles in 1976, just 18 years old. The next years she won the Swiss allround championships six times and participating in the international championships; twice at the World Junior Speed Skating Championships (1977 and 1978, winning a silver distance medal on the 500 meter both times); eight times at the World Sprint Speed Skating Championships (1977–1984); three times at the European Speed Skating Championships (1981–1983) and once at the World Allround Speed Skating Championships (1982) and the two before mentioned Winter Olympics. Over the course of her career Sylvia Brunner skated three speed skating world records for Juniors.

Records
Over the course of her career, Silvia Brunner skated three Junior World Records:

References
Notes

Bibliography

 Eng, Trond with Marnix Koolhaas. National All Time & Encyclopedia Men/Ladies as at 1.7.1985, Issue 1, Volume 2: Italy - Switzerland - Spain. Degernes, Norway: WSSSA-Skøytenytt, 1985.
 Eng, Trond with Preben G. Petersen and Magne Teigen. World All Time "Vierkampf", 1.7.1989. Veggli, Norway: WSSSA-Skøytenytt, 1989.

External links
 
 
 
 

1958 births
Living people
Swiss female speed skaters
Olympic speed skaters of Switzerland
Speed skaters at the 1980 Winter Olympics
Speed skaters at the 1984 Winter Olympics
People from Davos
Sportspeople from Graubünden